2016 Varsity Rugby was the 2016 edition of four rugby union competitions annually played between several university teams in South Africa. It was contested from 1 February to 18 April 2016 and was the ninth edition of these competitions.

On 1 March, it was also announced that the round of matches scheduled for 7 March would also be postponed, with the situation at various universities being monitored to determine when the competition will resume.

Rules

All four 2016 Varsity Rugby competitions used a different scoring system to the regular system. In the Varsity Cup, tries could be worth five, seven or nine points, depending on the point of origin of the try. In the Varsity Shield, Young Guns and Koshuis Rugby Championship competitions, tries were worth five points as usual, but conversions were worth three points, while penalties and drop goals were only worth two points.

Varsity Cup

All these teams also played in the competition in 2015.

Varsity Shield

Promotion/relegation play-offs

2017 Varsity Cup play-off

UCT Ikey Tigers won 40–5 to retain their place in the Varsity Cup for 2017, while UWC remained in the Varsity Shield competition.

Young Guns

Competition Rules

There were eight participating universities in the 2016 Young Guns competition. These teams were divided into two pools and each team played every team in the other pool once over the course of the season, either home or away.

Teams received four points for a win and two points for a draw. Bonus points were awarded to teams that scored four or more tries in a game, as well as to teams that lost a match by seven points or less. Teams were ranked by log points, then points difference (points scored less points conceded).

The top two teams overall qualified for the title play-off final.

Teams

Standings

The final league standings for the 2016 Varsity Cup Young Guns were:

Matches

The following matches were played in the 2016 Varsity Young Guns:

Round one

Round two

Round three

Round four

Round five

Round six

Final

Koshuis Rugby Championship

Competition Rules

There were eight participating teams in the 2016 Koshuis Rugby Championship competition, the winners of the internal leagues of each of the eight Varsity Cup teams. These teams were divided into two pools and each team played every team in the other pool once over the course of the season, either home or away.

Teams received four points for a win and two points for a draw. Bonus points were awarded to teams that scored four or more tries in a game, as well as to teams that lost a match by seven points or less. Teams were ranked by log points, then points difference (points scored less points conceded).

The top two teams overall qualified for the title play-off final.

Teams

Standings

The final league standings for the 2016 Koshuis Rugby Championship were:

Matches

The following matches were played in the 2016 Koshuis Rugby Championship:

Round one

Round two

Round three

Round four

Round five

Round six

Final

See also

 Varsity Cup
 2016 Varsity Cup
 2016 Varsity Shield
 2016 Gold Cup

References

External links
 

2016
2016 in South African rugby union
2016 rugby union tournaments for clubs